The surname Paniagua was first found in the mountainous regions of the ancient kingdom of Leon during the Middle Ages. The surname descends from Spanish and Portuguese ancestry and appears to be derived from a nickname. It was said to be the status name for a servant who worked for his board and lodging. It was most likely a form of "Pan y agua," which means literally "bread and water." This nickname would have been applied to the medieval beggars or travelers who went from town to town, asking for bread and water at various monasteries and manors in exchange for laborious work. 

The phrase “riding paniagua” was used by cyclist Tyler Hamilton in his memoir, The Secret Race, about professional road race cycling and his time as a teammate of Lance Armstrong. The phrase was used to describe those riding without the aid of performance-enhancing drugs such as EPO. 

Notable people with the name include:

Asdrubal Paniagua, Costa Rican retired professional football player
Cenobio Paniagua, Mexican composer 
César Montenegro Paniagua, Guatemalan politician
Eduardo Paniagua, Spanish architect and musician, member of the ensemble Atrium Musicae de Madrid
Gregorio Paniagua, founder of Spanish early music ensemble Atrium Musicae de Madrid
Javier Paniagua Fuentes, a Spanish author and politician
José Paniagua, retired Major League Baseball relief pitcher
Leonardo Paniagua, Dominican Republic's bachata musician
Valentín Paniagua, Peruvian politician and former Interim President of Peru.

References